The Court-Martial of Billy Mitchell is a 1955 American CinemaScope biographical drama film directed by Otto Preminger, and starring Gary Cooper and co-starring Charles Bickford, Ralph Bellamy, Rod Steiger, and Elizabeth Montgomery in her film debut. The film is based on the notorious 1925 court-martial of General Billy Mitchell, who is considered a founding figure of the U.S. Air Force.   During the 28th Academy Awards, it received a nomination for Best Story and Screenplay for Milton Sperling and Emmet Lavery. The award, however, went to Interrupted Melody (William Ludwig and Sonya Levien).

Plot
Brigadier General William "Billy" Mitchell (Gary Cooper) tries to prove the worth of the Air Service as an independent service by sinking a battleship under restrictive conditions agreed to by Army and Navy. He disobeys their orders to limit the attack to bombs under 1,000 pounds from an altitude of greater than 5,000 ft. and instead loads 2,000-pounders.  With these, Mitchell directs his aircraft to fly at 1,500 ft. and proves he can sink the ex-German World War I battleship , previously considered unsinkable. His superiors are outraged.

Mitchell is demoted to colonel and sent to a ground unit in Texas. A high-profile air disaster occurs in which his close friend Zachary Lansdowne (Jack Lord) is killed in the crash of the dirigible . This is followed by a second disaster in which six aircraft crash after flying from a base on the California coast to Fort Huachuca, Arizona. They were poorly maintained because of lack of funds.

Mitchell is outraged by the tragedy and calls a press conference in which he harshly accuses the Army and Navy of criminal negligence and almost treasonable disregard of the air service. This results in a court martial in Washington, D.C. He is represented by his friend, Illinois Congressman Frank R. Reid (Ralph Bellamy), an advocate of air power in Congress. None of the officers hearing the case, which includes General Douglas MacArthur, are in the Air Corps. Reid makes little headway. His request to call witnesses on the merits of Mitchell's position are denied. He asks who preferred the charges against Mitchell, and receiving no clear answer he demands the appearance as a witness of President Calvin Coolidge as commander of all armed forces. The court adjourns to consider the request..

Mitchell refuses to sign a paper Reid has presented him in which he withdraws his criticisms in return for saving his career as an Army officer. Margaret Lansdowne (Elizabeth Montgomery), widow of Mitchell's dead friend from the Shenandoah, then appears in court. Coolidge declines to appear, but witnesses on air power previously excluded are now allowed to testify to corroborate Mitchell's criticisms, including Eddie Rickenbacker (Tom McKee), Carl Spaatz (Steve Roberts), Henry H. Arnold (Robert Brubaker) and Fiorello LaGuardia (Phil Arnold).

Finally Mitchell testifies and is cross-examined by Maj. Allen W. Gullion (Rod Steiger), a prosecutor specially brought in for the job. He stresses that Mitchell had disobeyed his superior officers. Gullion also ridicules Mitchell's claims, such as his prediction that Japan would attack the U.S. Navy at Pearl Harbor.

The court finds Mitchell guilty, however his men in the air service salute him as he departs.  Mitchell steps out and looks up to see a squadron of four biplanes and fades to a squadron of fighter jets, demonstrating what Billy Mitchell's actions will result in for the future of the United States and its Air Force.

Cast

 Gary Cooper as Col. Billy Mitchell
 Charles Bickford as Maj. Gen. Jimmy Guthrie (based upon Maj. General Charles Pelot Summerall and Maj. General Robert Lee Howze)
 Ralph Bellamy as Congressman Frank R. Reid
 Rod Steiger as Maj. Allen W. Gullion
 Elizabeth Montgomery as Mrs. Margaret Lansdowne
 Fred Clark as Col. Sherman Moreland
 James Daly as Lt. Col. Herbert White
 Jack Lord as Lt. Cmdr. Zachary Lansdowne
 Peter Graves as Capt. Bob Elliott
 Darren McGavin as Capt. Russ Peters
 Robert Simon as Adm. Gage
 Charles Dingle as Unnamed US Senator
 Dayton Lummis as General Douglas MacArthur
 Tom McKee as Capt. Eddie Rickenbacker
 Steve Roberts as Major Carl Spaatz
 Herbert Heyes as General John J. Pershing
 Robert Brubaker as Major H. H. Arnold
 Phil Arnold as Fiorello LaGuardia
 Ian Wolfe as President Calvin Coolidge
 Will Wright as Admiral William S. Sims

Production
Producer and screenwriter Milton Sperling began work on Mitchell's story in 1938, just two years after the general's death. In the successive years, he continued to seek out help from Mitchell's family until 1955 when production began in earnest. Under the direction of Otto Preminger, the first 10 days of principal photography took place on location in Washington, D.C. in the original sites involved in the story. The old War Department Building, Army-Navy Club and State Department buildings, among others, were featured in key scenes.

Aerial sequences under the direction of second unit director Russ Saunders and aerial coordinator Paul Mantz took place at the Fletcher Airport in Rosamond, California. The aircraft that were used in the film included two Curtiss JN-4 biplanes, de Havilland DH-4, Grumman J2F Duck and Waco 10 biplanes.

Reception
The Court-Martial of Billy Mitchell had its national premiere in New York City on December 22, 1955 as the main feature along with the short 24 Hour Alert. The films, subsequently, were paired with the longer feature shown first in major cities. When The Court-Martial of Billy Mitchell was released, Mitchell's sister Ruth, who served in World War II with Yugoslavian Chetnik guerrillas and later wrote a book about her brother, toured the U.S. doing publicity for the film.

See also
 List of American films of 1955

References

Notes

Citations

Bibliography

 Orriss, Bruce. When Hollywood Ruled the Skies: The Post World War II Years. Hawthorne, California: Aero Associates Inc., 2018. .
 Paris, Michael. From the Wright Brothers to Top Gun: Aviation, Nationalism, and Popular Cinema. Manchester, UK: Manchester University Press, 1995. .
 Pendo, Stephen. Aviation in the Cinema. Lanham, Maryland: Scarecrow Press, 1985. .

External links
 
 
 
 
 The Court-Martial of Billy Mitchell at History on Film

1955 films
1950s biographical drama films
American biographical drama films
American aviation films
Films scored by Dimitri Tiomkin
Drama films based on actual events
Films directed by Otto Preminger
Films set in the 1920s
Military courtroom films
Warner Bros. films
Films with screenplays by Michael Wilson (writer)
Films with screenplays by Ben Hecht
Films with screenplays by Dalton Trumbo
Cultural depictions of Calvin Coolidge
Cultural depictions of Douglas MacArthur
Films set in Washington, D.C.
Films set in Texas
1955 drama films
CinemaScope films
1950s English-language films
1950s American films